State Route 76 (SR 76) is a  state highway in Shelby and Talladega counties in the U.S. state of Alabama. The western terminus of the highway is at an intersection with SR 25 north of Wilsonville, and the eastern terminus of the highway is at an intersection with SR 21 at Winterboro.

Route description
As a standalone highway, SR 76 is two-lane highway that travels through rural areas of Shelby and Talladega counties. SR 76 is then concurrent with US 231 and US 280 along a four-lane divided highway leading into Childersburg, where it diverts from the U.S. Highways. From Childersburg until the highway’s terminus at Winterboro, SR 76 is again routed along a two-lane highway.

Major intersections

See also

References

076
Transportation in Shelby County, Alabama
Transportation in Talladega County, Alabama